Mishni may refer to:

Mishni, Iran
Mişni, Kalbajar, Azerbaijan
Mişni, Lachin, Azerbaijan